Niklas Friberg (born 14 March 1996) is a Finnish professional footballer who plays for Haka, as a defender.

Club career
On 18 December 2018, he agreed to join Haka for the 2019 season.

References

1996 births
Living people
Finnish footballers
Association football defenders
Salon Palloilijat players
Turun Palloseura footballers
FC Haka players
Veikkausliiga players
Ykkönen players
Kakkonen players